Karanjadi railway station is a station on the Konkan Railway. It is  down from railway terminus at Roha railway station. The preceding station on the line is Sape Wamane railway station, a halt station, and the next station is Vinhere railway station.

References

Railway stations along Konkan Railway line
Railway stations in Raigad district
Ratnagiri railway division